In particle physics, Fermi's interaction (also the Fermi theory of beta decay or the Fermi four-fermion interaction) is an explanation of the beta decay, proposed by Enrico Fermi in 1933. The theory posits four fermions directly interacting with one another (at one vertex of the associated Feynman diagram). This interaction explains beta decay of a neutron by direct coupling of a neutron with an electron, a neutrino (later determined to be an antineutrino) and a proton.

Fermi first introduced this coupling in his description of beta decay in 1933.  The Fermi interaction was the precursor to the theory for the weak interaction where the interaction between the proton–neutron and electron–antineutrino is mediated by a virtual W− boson, of which the Fermi theory is the low-energy effective field theory.

History of initial rejection and later publication 
Fermi first submitted his "tentative" theory of beta decay to the prestigious science journal Nature, which rejected it "because it contained speculations too remote from reality to be of interest to the reader." Nature later admitted the rejection to be one of the great editorial blunders in its history. Fermi then submitted revised versions of the paper to Italian and German publications, which accepted and published them in those languages in 1933 and 1934. The paper did not appear at the time in a primary publication in English.  An English translation of the seminal paper was published in the American Journal of Physics in 1968.

Fermi found the initial rejection of the paper so troubling that he decided to take some time off from theoretical physics, and do only experimental physics. This would lead shortly to his famous work with activation of nuclei with slow neutrons.

The "tentativo"

Definitions 

The theory deals with three types of particles presumed to be in direct interaction: initially a “heavy particle” in the “neutron state”, which then transitions into its “proton state” with the emission of an electron and a neutrino.

Electron state

where  is the single-electron wavefunction,  are its stationary states.

 is the operator which annihilates an electron in state  which acts on the Fock space as

 is the creation operator for electron state :

Neutrino state
Similarly,

 is the operator which annihilates a neutrino in state  which acts on the Fock space as

 is the creation operator for neutrino state .

Heavy particle state
 is the operator introduced by Heisenberg (later generalized into isospin) that acts on a heavy particle state, which has eigenvalue +1 when the particle is a neutron, and −1 if the particle is a proton. Therefore, heavy particle states will be represented by two-row column vectors, where

represents a neutron, and

represents a proton (in the representation where  is the usual  spin matrix).

The operators that change a heavy particle from a proton into a neutron and vice versa are respectively represented by

and

 resp.  is an eigenfunction for a neutron resp. proton in the state .

Hamiltonian

The Hamiltonian is composed of three parts: , representing the energy of the free heavy particles, representing the energy of the free light particles, and a part giving the interaction .

The interaction part must contain a term representing the transformation of a proton into a neutron along with the emission of an electron and a neutrino (now known to be an antineutrino), as well as a term for the inverse process; the Coulomb force between the electron and proton is ignored as irrelevant to the -decay process.

Fermi proposes two possible values for : first, a non-relativistic version which ignores spin:

Matrix elements

where the integral is taken over the entire configuration space of the heavy particles (except for ). The  is determined by whether the total number of light particles is odd (−) or even (+).

Transition probability

To calculate the lifetime of a neutron in a state  according to the usual Quantum perturbation theory, the above matrix elements must be summed over all unoccupied electron and neutrino states. This leads to

According to Fermi's golden rule, the probability of this transition is

where  is the difference in the energy of the proton and neutron states.

Averaging over all positive-energy neutrino spin / momentum directions (where  is the density of neutrino states, eventually taken to infinity), we obtain

Fermi makes three remarks about this function:
 
 Since for the electrons , in order for -decay to occur, the proton–neutron energy difference must be 
 The factor 
 
in the transition probability is normally of magnitude 1, but in special circumstances it vanishes; this leads to (approximate) selection rules for -decay.

Forbidden transitions

As noted above, when the inner product  between the heavy particle states  and  vanishes, the associated transition is "forbidden" (or, rather, much less likely than in cases where it is closer to 1).

If the description of the nucleus in terms of the individual quantum states of the protons and neutrons is good,  vanishes unless the neutron state  and the proton state  have the same angular momentum; otherwise, the angular momentum of the whole nucleus before and after the decay must be used.

Influence

Shortly after Fermi's paper appeared, Werner Heisenberg noted in a letter to Wolfgang Pauli that the emission and absorption of neutrinos and electrons in the nucleus should, at the second order of perturbation theory, lead to an attraction between protons and neutrons, analogously to how the emission and absorption of photons leads to the electromagnetic force. He found that the force would be of the form , but that contemporary experimental data led to a value that was too small by a factor of a million.

The following year, Hideki Yukawa picked up on this idea, but in his theory the neutrinos and electrons were replaced by a new hypothetical particle with a rest mass approximately 200 times heavier than the electron.

Later developments

Fermi's four-fermion theory describes the weak interaction remarkably well. Unfortunately, the calculated cross-section, or probability of interaction, grows as the square of the energy .  Since this cross section grows without bound, the theory is not valid at energies much higher than about 100 GeV. Here  is the Fermi constant, which denotes the strength of the interaction. This eventually led to the replacement of the four-fermion contact interaction by a more complete theory (UV completion)—an exchange of a W or Z boson as explained in the electroweak theory.

The interaction could also explain muon decay via a coupling of a muon, electron-antineutrino, muon-neutrino and electron, with the same fundamental strength of the interaction. This hypothesis was put forward by Gershtein and Zeldovich and is known as the Vector Current Conservation hypothesis.

In the original theory, Fermi assumed that the form of interaction is a contact coupling of two vector currents. Subsequently, it was pointed out by Lee and Yang that nothing prevented the appearance of an axial, parity violating current, and this was confirmed by experiments carried out by Chien-Shiung Wu.

The inclusion of parity violation in Fermi's interaction was done by George Gamow and Edward Teller in the so-called Gamow–Teller transitions which described Fermi's interaction in terms of parity-violating "allowed" decays and parity-conserving "superallowed" decays in terms of anti-parallel and parallel electron and neutrino spin states respectively. Before the advent of the electroweak theory and the Standard Model, George Sudarshan and Robert Marshak, and also independently Richard Feynman and Murray Gell-Mann, were able to determine the correct tensor structure (vector minus axial vector) of the four-fermion interaction.

Fermi constant
In modern terms, the "reduced Fermi constant", that is, the constant in natural units is

In the Standard Model, the Fermi constant is related to the Higgs vacuum expectation value 
.

More directly, approximately (tree level for the standard model),

References

Interaction
Weak interaction